Tsarevna Feodosia Alekseyevna (29 March 1662 – 14 December 1713) was the seventh daughter of Tsar Alexis of Russia and Maria Miloslavskaya, sister of Tsar Feodor III of Russia and Tsar Ivan V of Russia and half-sister of Tsar Peter the Great.

Feodosia Alekseyevna was described as a reserved and compassionate woman, with a need to be of use to those closest to her, and she lived a life in seclusion in the terem with her sisters and aunts, to whom she was devoted, and reportedly took no part in politics or the intrigues of the court. In 1683, it was noted that she lived in the household of her aunt Tsarevna Tatyana Mikhailovna of Russia and as devoted as a nun. For her part in the Streltsy uprising 1698 with her sister Marfa Alekseyevna of Russia, they were forced to become a nun. With Feodosia becoming a nun under the name  Susanna.

References

Григорян В. Г. Романовы. Биографический справочник. — М.:АСТ,2007.

1662 births
1713 deaths
Russian tsarevnas
House of Romanov
Royalty from Moscow
17th-century Russian people
18th-century people from the Russian Empire
17th-century Russian women
18th-century women from the Russian Empire
Children of Alexis of Russia